Strings is a 2011 American dramatic thriller film about a musician who discovers his therapist manipulates patients into committing crimes. The film is the product of the Texas filmmaking team, Mark Dennis and Ben Foster. It was written, produced, and directed by Dennis and was produced and directed by Foster.  Dennis and Foster graduated from the University of Texas at Austin with degrees in Radio/TV/Film and are both musicians. The extremely low-budget film collected major awards at film festivals across the United States in 2011 and 2012.

American film festival screenings 
 Austin Film Festival – October 2011 
 The Breckenridge Festival of Film – June 2011
 Hollywood Film Festival – October 2011 
 Long Island International Film Expo – July 2011
 Route 66 International Film Festival – September 2011
 San Francisco Best Actors (in a) Film Festival – May 2011
 Silver City Film Festival – November 2011 
 SOHO International Film Festival - April 2012 
 The Tri-State Film Festival – September 2012 
 Tulsa International Film Festival – September 2011 
 The White Sands International Film Festival – August 2011

Reception 
One reviewer compared Strings to the work of Christopher Nolan, describing it as "stirring, exciting, and poignant." The film received DVD distribution with House Lights Media, based in Colorado and digital distribution with The Orchard.

Awards 
The film collected the Best Director Award at the Long Island International Film Expo as well as Audience Awards at The Breckenridge Festival of Film and The White Sands International Film Festival and the award for Best Thriller at the Route 66 International Film Festival.

 Best Film at the SOHO International Film Festival 
 Best Director (Mark Dennis and Ben Foster) at the Tulsa International Film Festival
 Best Director (Mark Dennis and Ben Foster) at the Long Island International Film Expo
 Audience Award at White Sands International Film Festival
 Audience Award at the Breckenridge Festival of Film
 Audience Award at the Silver City Film Festival 
 Best Cinematography (Mike Simpson) at the Long Island International Film Expo
 Best Supporting Actor (Jack Lee) at the Long Island International Film Expo
 Best Song (The Greatest Escape, Billy Harvey) at the Breckenridge Festival of Film
 Best Ensemble Cast, San Francisco Best Actors Film Festival
 Best Thriller, Route 66 International Film Festival

References

External links 
 
 Ain't It Cool News film review
 The Austin Chronicle film review

2011 films
2011 psychological thriller films
2010s science fiction films
American independent films
American psychological thriller films
American science fiction films
Films shot in Texas
2011 directorial debut films
2010s English-language films
2010s American films